Geal-Chàrn (Scottish Gaelic: White Peak) is a mountain in the Highlands of Scotland, 14 kilometres North East of Corrour railway station

See also 
 Ben Nevis
 List of Munro mountains
 Mountains and hills of Scotland

References

Marilyns of Scotland
Munros
Mountains and hills of the Central Highlands
Mountains and hills of Highland (council area)
One-thousanders of Scotland